Surveillance Oz is an Australian factual television series screened on the Seven Network that premiered in October 2012. In May 2015, spin-off series Surveillance Oz: Dash Cam launched.

In March 2019, Seven Studios announced that Surveillance Oz will return with Season 6 in 2021.

About  
Every day tens of thousands of cameras in cars are monitoring what goes on across the roads of Australia, and you will not believe what they are recording. In this series, you see in real time the accidents, road rage incidents and dangerous driving that happens around the country, all captured on dashcams.

Series overview

Episodes

Series 1 (2012)

Series 2 (2013)

Series 3 (2014)

Series 4 (2016)

Series 5 (2016–2018)

Series 6 (2021) 
Season 6 of Surveillance Oz has already aired in New Zealand & Australia.

Surveillance Oz Specials

See also
 List of Australian television series

References

Australian factual television series
Seven Network original programming
2012 Australian television series debuts
Television series by Seven Productions